Eagle-Eye Lanoo Cherry (born 7 May 1968) is a Swedish singer and stage performer. His 1997 single "Save Tonight" achieved commercial success in Ireland, the United States and the United Kingdom, and was voted song of the year in New Zealand. Cherry is the son of American jazz artist Don Cherry and Swedish artist and designer Moki Cherry.

He pursued acting during high school, though Cherry's acting career was eventually set aside as his musical career took precedence in his life with his debut album Desireless (1997). He has released several other albums since his debut, and has co-written for other artists and films, and has guest-starred on reality television. Cherry's music is of the acoustic, rock, post-grunge and alternative rock genres.

He is fluent in both English and Swedish.

Early life
Cherry was born on 7 May 1968, in Stockholm, Sweden, the son of American jazz artist Don Cherry and Swedish painter/textile artist Monika Cherry (née Karlsson). Of Choctaw descent through his paternal grandmother and African-American through his grandfather, Cherry is the fourth of five siblings. He is the half-brother of singer Neneh Cherry (his mother's daughter with Ahmadu Jah). Other half-siblings are violinist Jan Cherry, Christian Cherry, and jazz musician David Ornette Cherry. At the age of 12, Cherry was sent to school in New York City. He remained there to work as an actor and a drummer in various bands. At 16, he enrolled in the High School of Performing Arts in New York in the same class as Jennifer Aniston and Chaz Bono.

Career
In 1988, Cherry was credited as "Teenager" in the film Arthur 2: On the Rocks. In 1989 he was credited as "Vet #1" in Born on the Fourth of July. In 1993 he starred on the short-lived NBC action/adventure television show South Beach.

Cherry's father died in 1995. He returned to Stockholm to focus on his music rather than an acting career. He began writing and recording his debut album, Desireless, in his bedroom studio on an acoustic guitar. According to manager Tommy Manzi, Cherry's perfectionism made him keep the recordings under wraps until the album was virtually complete. The album became a commercial success throughout the world. Desireless sold four million copies worldwide and was certified platinum in the United States.

Cherry co-wrote and sang on "Wishing It Was" on Santana's 1999 album Supernatural, as well as in films such as Wim Wenders' The Soul of a Man, Y tu mamá también, The Love of the Game, GO, Best Laid Plans, Holes, Billy Elliot and Over Her Dead Body. Some of his best-known songs include "Save Tonight", "Falling in Love Again", "Are You Still Having Fun?", "Long Way Around", "Feels So Right", "Skull Tattoo" and "Don't Give Up".

On 27 November 2012, he appeared as musical guest on The Voice of Romania. His fifth album, Streets of You, was released on 26 October 2018.

Discography

Studio albums

Live albums

Singles

Featured singles

Filmography

Film

Television

References

External links
Official website archived at the Wayback Machine (last updated January 2014)

1968 births
Living people
English-language singers from Sweden
MTV Europe Music Award winners
People of Choctaw descent
Singers from Stockholm
Swedish male singers
Swedish people of African-American descent